The following is a list of state highways in the U.S. state of Louisiana designated in the 700-749 range.


Louisiana Highway 700

Louisiana Highway 700 (LA 700) runs  in a general north–south direction from LA 35 north of Kaplan, Vermilion Parish to LA 342 in southwestern Lafayette Parish.   The route travels in a reverse "L" shape along rural section line roads.

LA 700 has a brief concurrency with LA 92 in an area known as Indian Bayou. It then crosses the waterway of the same name, simultaneously crossing from Vermilion Parish into Lafayette Parish. LA 700 continues a short distance further to an intersection with LA 342 west of Ridge. It is an undivided two-lane highway for its entire length.

Louisiana Highway 705

Louisiana Highway 705 (LA 705) runs  in an east–west direction from the Acadia Parish line to LA 35 west of Indian Bayou, Vermilion Parish.  It is an undivided two-lane highway for its entire length.

Louisiana Highway 708

Louisiana Highway 711

Louisiana Highway 712

Louisiana Highway 712 (LA 712) runs  in a north–south direction along Wright Road in northwestern Vermilion Parish.

The route begins at LA 14 in Wright and proceeds due north to a junction with Tom Road.  It is an undivided two-lane highway for its entire length.

In the pre-1955 state highway system, LA 712 was designated as State Route C-1574.  LA 712 was created with the 1955 Louisiana Highway renumbering, and its route has remained the same to the present day.

Louisiana Highway 713

Louisiana Highway 714

Louisiana Highway 717

Louisiana Highway 717 (LA 717) begins at LA 14 west of Gueydan. It travels west, north, and east before ending at another point on LA 14 south of Lake Arthur.

Louisiana Highway 719

Louisiana Highway 719 (LA 719) runs  in a north–south direction from LA 342 west of Ridge to US 90 in Duson, Lafayette Parish.

Louisiana Highway 720

Louisiana Highway 720 (LA 720) runs  in an east–west direction from the Acadia Parish line to LA 343 south of Duson, Lafayette Parish.

Louisiana Highway 723

Louisiana Highway 724

Louisiana Highway 725

Louisiana Highway 726

Louisiana Highway 726 (LA 726) runs  in an east–west direction from LA 182 to the concurrent I-49 and US 167 in Carencro, Lafayette Parish.

Louisiana Highway 728

Louisiana Highway 728 (LA 728) is a collection of two state highways in Walroy south of Lafayette in Lafayette Parish. Both highways are part of Hugh Wallis Road and generally run parallel to US 90 and a BNSF railroad.

LA 728-2 begins at a curve tangent and heads north-northwest past a hotel and a few homes. The highway ends at LA 729 (General Mouton Avenue).
LA 728-3 begins at a superstreet intersection with US 90 where it travels west to cross the railroad, then turns to the north-northwest along Hugh Wallis Road. It ends at a right in/right out intersection with Kaliste Saloom Road.

The two current sections of road were previously united as LA 728-2. The highway had previously crossed Kaliste Saloom Road before a portion of Hugh Wallis Road to the north was realigned and transferred out of state jurisdiction. The construction that created the two separate sections occurred between 2015 and 2016.

Louisiana Highway 729

Louisiana Highway 729 (LA 729) runs  in an east–west direction along General Mouton Avenue from US 90 Business to mainline US 90 in Lafayette, Lafayette Parish. Under the proposed La DOTD plan to eliminate state-maintained roadways throughout the state, all of LA 729 is proposed to be transferred to local jurisdiction.

One unsigned  spur route, LA 729 Spur, exits in Lafayette. It essentially acts as a private driveway for a nearby car dealership and has gates and private signage though per recent La DOTD documents, the road is still state-maintained.

Major junctions

Louisiana Highway 731

Louisiana Highway 731 (LA 731) ran  in a northwest to southeast direction along 2nd Street from US 90 to LA 182-2 in Broussard, Lafayette Parish.  It was decommissioned and transferred to local control in 2021.

Major junctions

Louisiana Highway 731 Spur
One  spur route, LA 731 Spur, existed along North Morgan Avenue in Broussard. It traveled from Main Street (a former section of LA 182) to 2nd Street (LA 731). It was also decommissioned and transferred to local control in 2021.

Major junctions

Louisiana Highway 733

Louisiana Highway 734

The highway was retired in 2013 and handed over to local jurisdictions for maintenance.

Louisiana Highway 737

Louisiana Highway 740

Louisiana Highway 740 (LA 740) runs  in a north–south direction from LA 347 in Arnaudville, St. Landry Parish to the northern town limits.

Louisiana Highway 741

Louisiana Highway 742

Louisiana Highway 743

Louisiana Highway 744

Louisiana Highway 744 (LA 744) runs  in an east–west direction from the junction of I-49 and US 167 to LA 743 southeast of Washington, St. Landry Parish.

Louisiana Highway 745

Louisiana Highway 746

Louisiana Highway 746 (LA 746) runs  in an east–west direction from a dead end at Camp Thistlethwaite to LA 745 north of Washington, St. Landry Parish.

Louisiana Highway 748

Louisiana Highway 749

References

External links
La DOTD State, District, and Parish Maps